Apostolepis phillipsae, Phillips's  blackhead, is a species of snake in the family Colubridae. It is found in Bolivia and Brazil.

References 

phillipsae
Reptiles described in 1999
Reptiles of Bolivia
Reptiles of Brazil
Taxa named by Michael B. Harvey